was a senior retainer of the Takeda clan during the late Sengoku period of Japanese history. He was known as one of the 'Twenty-Four Generals of Takeda Shingen'. 

Masatane was a relative of Hara Toratane, though from a different branch of the family, and was also a skilled commander. He was present at the Battle of Mimasetoge in 1569 and was killed in the forefront of the fighting in the Battle of Nagashino in 1575.

References

Further reading
 Turnbull, Stephen. Kawanakajima 1553-64: Samurai Power Struggle

External links 
  "Legendary Takeda's 24 Generals" at Yamanashi-kankou.jp

Samurai
1531 births
1575 deaths
Takeda retainers
Japanese warriors killed in battle